Marcelo Alejandro Estigarribia Balmori (born 21 September 1987) is a Paraguayan footballer who plays as a left winger for Sol de América in the Primera División Paraguaya.

Estigarribia has been known since youth as Chelo, as a diminutive of his name Marcelo. He also has an Italian passport by way of his mother. At club level, Estigarribia has played for teams in Paraguay, France, Uruguay, Argentina, Italy, and Mexico. At international level, he has represented the Paraguay national football team, and was  member of the squad that finished second at the 2011 Copa América.

Biography 
Estigarribia was born and raised in Fernando de la Mora, one kilometer away from the Paraguayan capital Asunción. He comes from a strongly Catholic family.

Club career

Club Unión Pacífico 
Estigarribia started his career in the youth divisions of Club Unión Pacífico before moving to Sport Colombia where he made his professional debut at the age of 17.

Le Mans 
In 2006, Estigarribia moved to Paraguayan side Cerro Porteño, and in August 2008 he was transferred to Le Mans of the Ligue 1.

Newell's Old Boys 
On 27 December 2009, Estigarribia signed for Newell's Old Boys on loan from Le Mans for 18 months. In June 2011, it was reported by the Daily Record that Scottish Premier League club Rangers were chasing Estigarribia when their boss Ally McCoist spent a week scouting in Argentina.

Juventus 
On 28 August 2011, Estigarribia moved to Juventus F.C. on a season loan for a €500,000 fee, with an option of making the transfer permanent for €5 million at the end of the season, from a proxy club Deportivo Maldonado. He made his debut as a substitute against Chievo and got his first start against Genoa. He scored his first goal for Juventus against Napoli where the match ended in a 3–3 tie.

Sampdoria 
On 4 August 2012, Estigarribia moved to U.C. Sampdoria on a season-long loan for a €700,000 fee, with the option of making his stay with Sampdoria permanent for €5 million at the end of the season. He made his debut with Blucerchiati against A.C. Milan, winning 0–1.

Chiapas 
On 25 January 2017, Estigarribia joined Liga MX side Chiapas

Colón 
On 22 August 2017, Estigarribia joined Argentine club Club Atlético Colón.

Olimpia Asunción
In January 2021, it was announced that Estigarribia signed a one-year agreement with Olimpia Asunción. The club announced the signing through its official website. His arrival at the club was through a request of the coach, the Argentine Nestor Gorosito, who stated that Estigarribia can be used in three positions.

International career 
Estigarribia received his first senior international cap for Paraguay in a friendly match against Ivory Coast on 22 May 2008. He scored his first international goal in a friendly match against South Africa on 31 March 2010. His performances in the 2011 Copa América, where Paraguay went on to reach the final of the tournament, only to lose out 3–0 to Uruguay, prompted Italian giants Juventus to make a move for him.

Career statistics

Club

International goals 

|-
| 1. || 31 March 2010 || Defensores del Chaco, Asuncion, Paraguay ||  || 1–0 || 1–1 || Friendly
|}

Honours 
Juventus
Serie A: (1) 2011–12

References

External links 
 
 
 
 
 Argentine Primera statistics at Fútbol XXI 

1987 births
Living people
People from Fernando de la Mora, Paraguay
Paraguayan people of Basque descent
Paraguayan footballers
Paraguayan expatriate footballers
Association football midfielders
Cerro Porteño players
Le Mans FC players
Newell's Old Boys footballers
Juventus F.C. players
U.C. Sampdoria players
A.C. ChievoVerona players
Atalanta B.C. players
Chiapas F.C. footballers
Club Atlético Colón footballers
Deportivo Maldonado players
Club Olimpia footballers
Club Sol de América footballers
Paraguayan Primera División players
Uruguayan Primera División players
Ligue 1 players
Argentine Primera División players
Serie A players
Liga MX players
Paraguay international footballers
Paraguay under-20 international footballers
2011 Copa América players
Expatriate footballers in France
Expatriate footballers in Argentina
Expatriate footballers in Italy
Expatriate footballers in Mexico
Expatriate footballers in Uruguay
Paraguayan expatriate sportspeople in France
Paraguayan expatriate sportspeople in Argentina
Paraguayan expatriate sportspeople in Italy
Paraguayan expatriate sportspeople in Mexico
Paraguayan expatriate sportspeople in Uruguay